Saint-Alexis-des-Monts is a parish municipality in the Mauricie region of the province of Quebec in Canada.

There are more than 600 lakes, 400 named and another 200 unnamed minor lakes. The majority (65%) of its territory is part of the Matawin Wildlife Reserve. The town depends on outdoor tourism that increases its seasonal population to between 8000 and 10,000 persons.

History
The first settlers were originally from Saint-Paulin and established the community on the banks of the Du Loup River, north-west of Saint-Paulin, around 1865. On October 30 of that year, Alexis Lefebvre Boulanger (1812-1885), pioneer and farmer, donated the land on which the village's chapel was built in 1867, and the church in 1884. Saint-Alexis was named after him.

Its post office, identified as Saint-Alexis-des-Monts, opened in 1876. In 1877, the Parish Municipality of Saint-Alexis-des-Monts was formed.

In 1973, a portion of Saint-Alexis-des-Monts separated and formed the Municipality of Belleau, named in honour of Sir Narcisse-Fortunat Belleau (1808-1894), former lieutenant-governor of Quebec. On December 9, 1995,  was added following the annexation of the Lac-Marcotte and Lac-au-Sorcier unorganized territories.

Demographics 

Population trend:
 Population in 2016: 2981 (2011 to 2016 population change: -2.1%)
 Population in 2011: 3046 (2006 to 2011 population change: -2.3%)
 Population in 2006: 3118
 Population in 2001: 2909
 Population in 1996: 2741
 Population in 1991: 2745

Mother tongue:
 English as first language: 0.5%
 French as first language: 97.7%
 English and French as first language: 0%
 Other as first language: 1.8%

References

External links
Logement, Chalet, Maison a louer
Tout savoir sur St-Alexis Des Monts

Parish municipalities in Quebec
Incorporated places in Mauricie